This is a list of people who have served as Vice-Admiral of Somerset.

Sir William Wynter bef. 1561 – 1589
Edward Wynter 1589 – aft. 1605
Sir Edward Rodney 1625–1642
English Interregnum
vacant
Francis Luttrell 1685–1690
Sir Edward Phelips 1690–1697
Henry Henley 1697–1702
Sir Francis Warre, 1st Baronet 1702–1709
Sir William Wyndham, 3rd Baronet 1709–1715
George Dodington 1715–1720
George Dodington, 1st Baron Melcombe 1720–1762
vacant
John Perceval, 2nd Earl of Egmont 1766–1770
vacant
Edward St Maur, 11th Duke of Somerset 1831–1855

References
Institute of Historical Research

Somerset
Vice Admiral
Military history of Somerset